Stranglers' Moon is a 1976 science fiction novel by American writer Stephen Goldin, the second book in the  Family D'Alembert series, the first of which was expanded by Goldin from a novella by E.E. “Doc” Smith.
 
This is the second in a series of ten Family D'Alembert novels. Set in a future where humankind has expanded to the stars but reverted to an old-style feudal system of government in an advanced technological setting, all known planets and space are ruled by an Earth-based Empire.

Plot summary 
Jules and Yvette D'Alembert are a brother and sister team of aerialists in the D'Alembert family Circus of the Empire. But they are also legendary agents "Wombat" and "Periwinkle" in SOTE, "The Service of The Empire", the imperial intelligence agency, sent to investigate the disappearance of a planetary economist and his wife on a moon devoted to recreation: seemingly a vacationers' paradise...

The plot is based in part on Thuggee.

External links 
 

1976 American novels
1976 science fiction novels
American science fiction novels
Pyramid Books books